Shattered Chains is a novel by Clayton Emery published by Boxtree in 1995.

Plot summary
Shattered Chains is a Magic: The Gathering novel which details the efforts of an untrained mage (Greensleeves) and her brother (Gull the Woodcutter) as they try to combat the evil manipulation of magic for wizards' personal gain.

Reception
Paul Pettengale reviewed Shattered Chains for Arcane magazine, rating it a 3 out of 10 overall. Pettengale comments that "The writing style is poor, the plot mediocre and the only joy to be gleaned from it is that of relishing the profound lack of style which the author possesses."

Review
Review by John C. Bunnell (1995) in Dragon Magazine, #219, July 1995
Review by Lynne Bispham (1996) in Vector 188

References

1995 novels
Novels based on Magic: The Gathering